Joël Ayayi (born 5 March 2000) is a French professional basketball player for the Lakeland Magic of the NBA G League. He played college basketball for the Gonzaga Bulldogs.

Early life and career
Ayayi was born and raised in Bordeaux, France. Growing up, he idolized National Basketball Association (NBA) player and Bordeaux native Boris Diaw. Ayayi attended INSEP, a sports institute in Paris, and played for affiliated club Centre Fédéral.

Recruiting
He was considered a four-star recruit by Rivals and received NCAA Division I offers from Baylor, Georgia Tech, and Gonzaga. On 27 April 2017, Ayayi committed to play college basketball for Gonzaga.

Source: Rivals, Scout, ESPN

College career
Ayayi joined the Gonzaga basketball team at age 17 and redshirted his first season to train with the team. In his redshirt freshman season, he averaged 5.6 minutes per game through 23 contests. On 27 November 2019, early in his sophomore season, Ayayi posted 21 points, 12 rebounds and six assists in a win over Southern Miss. He had 20 points in a 94–50 win over San Diego on 9 January 2020. At the conclusion of the regular season, Ayayi was named Honorable Mention All-West Coast Conference (WCC). On 10 March, he helped Gonzaga win the WCC tournament and was named Most Outstanding Player after scoring 17 points in the final against Saint Mary's. He averaged 10.6 points, 6.3 rebounds, and 3.2 per game for the Bulldogs and was All-WCC honorable mention. Following the season he declared for the 2020 NBA draft but did not hire an agent. On 1 August, Ayayi announced he was withdrawing from the draft and returning for his junior season.

Coming into his junior season, Ayayi was named to the Preseason All-WCC team. On 9 January 2021, he recorded the first triple-double in program history, with 12 points, 13 rebounds and 14 assists in a 116–88 win over Portland. He also tallied the second-most assists for a Gonzaga player in a single game. As a junior, he averaged 12 points, 6.9 rebounds and 2.7 assists per game and was named to the First Team All-West Coast Conference. Following the season, Ayayi declared for the 2021 NBA draft and forgo his remaining college eligibility.

Professional career

Washington Wizards (2021–2022)
After going undrafted in the 2021 NBA draft, Ayayi signed a two-way contract  with the Los Angeles Lakers on 3 August 2021. Under the terms of the deal he was to split time between the Lakers and their NBA G League affiliate, the South Bay Lakers. On 15 October, he was waived by Los Angeles and two days later, he signed a two-way contract with the Washington Wizards. Ayayi was then later waived on 8 March 2022.

Capital City Go-Go (2022)
On March 11, 2022, Ayayi was reacquired by the Capital City Go-Go.

Ayayi joined the Atlanta Hawks for the 2022 NBA Summer League.

Lakeland Magic (2022–present)
On November 3, 2022, Ayayi was named to the opening night roster for the Lakeland Magic.

National team career
Ayayi holds dual citizenship to France and his parents' home country of Benin, but he plays basketball for the French national teams. At the 2016 FIBA U16 European Championship in Radom, Poland, he averaged 11.3 points and 6.7 rebounds per game for France. Ayayi led his team to a bronze medal at the 2018 FIBA U18 European Championship in Latvia. After averaging 15.7 points per game, he was named to the All-Star Five. Ayayi helped France win bronze at the 2019 FIBA Under-19 Basketball World Cup in Heraklion, Greece, where he earned All-Star Five honors. He averaged 20.9 points, 5.6 rebounds, and 3.4 assists per game and led all scorers with 33 points in a bronze medal game against Lithuania.

Career statistics

NBA

|-
| style="text-align:left;"| 
| style="text-align:left;"| Washington
| 7 || 0 || 2.9 || .167 || .000 ||  || .4 || .6 || .0 || .0 || .3
|- class="sortbottom"
| style="text-align:center;" colspan="2"| Career
| 7 || 0 || 2.9 || .167 || .000 ||  || .4 || .6 || .0 || .0 || .3

College

|-
| style="text-align:left;"| 2017–18
| style="text-align:left;"| Gonzaga
| style="text-align:center;" colspan="11"|  Redshirt
|-
| style="text-align:left;"| 2018–19
| style="text-align:left;"| Gonzaga
| 23 || 0 || 5.6 || .531 || .273 || .286 || 1.4 || .5 || .3 || 0 || 1.7
|-
| style="text-align:left;"| 2019–20
| style="text-align:left;"| Gonzaga
| 33 || 23 || 29.3 || .483 || .345 || .825 || 6.3 || 3.2 || 1.3 || .2 || 10.6
|-
| style="text-align:left;"| 2020–21
| style="text-align:left;"| Gonzaga
| 32 || 31 || 31.3 || .575 || .389 || .781 || 6.9 || 2.7 || 1.1 || .2 || 12.0
|- class="sortbottom"
| style="text-align:center;" colspan="2"| Career
| 88 || 54 || 23.8 || .529 || .360 || .776 || 5.2 || 2.3 || .9 || .2 || 8.8

Personal life
Both of Ayayi's parents are from Benin. His father stands  and played basketball professionally in France and for the Beninese national team. Ayayi's older sister Valériane has played for the French women's national team, most notably at the 2016 Summer Olympics, and in the Women's National Basketball Association (WNBA). His younger brother Gérald plays professional basketball in France.

References

External links
Gonzaga Bulldogs bio

2000 births
Living people
Black French sportspeople
Capital City Go-Go players
Centre Fédéral de Basket-ball players
French expatriate basketball people in the United States
French men's basketball players
French sportspeople of Beninese descent
Gonzaga Bulldogs men's basketball players
Lakeland Magic players
National Basketball Association players from France
Shooting guards
Sportspeople from Bordeaux
Undrafted National Basketball Association players
Washington Wizards players